The women's individual foil competition at the 2014 Asian Games in Goyang was held on 21 September at the Goyang Gymnasium.

Schedule
All times are Korea Standard Time (UTC+09:00)

Results

Preliminaries

Pool A

Pool B

Pool C

Summary

Knockout round

Final standing

References
Women's Individual Foil Results

External links
Official website

Women foil